National Highway 717 (NH 717) is a  national highway in India. This highway runs entirely in the state of West Bengal. It is a secondary route of National Highway 17. Prior to renumbering of national highways in 2010, the stretch between Chalsa and Mainaguri was part of old national highway 31. By a gazette notification on 27 December 2013, NH-717 route was extended from Mainaguri to land border crossing of India/Bangladesh border near Changrabandha. Mainaguri to Changrabandha stretch of this route is part of Asian Highway 48.

Route

Junctions  

  Terminal near Chalsa.
  near Mainaguri.
  Bangladesh highway at Indo/Bangladesh Border

See also
 List of National Highways in India
 List of National Highways in India by state

References

External links
 NH 717 on OpenStreetMap

National highways in India
National Highways in West Bengal